Wohoa Bay is a bay on the coast of Washington County, Maine. It is located between the towns of Addison and Jonesport. It features a coastal plateau bog ecosystem not found anywhere else in North America. Three rare species have been found in Wohoa Bay, including the crowberry, blue butterfly and bald eagle. Both West River and Indian River drain into Wohoa Bay.

The bay is home to a number of islands, including Chandler Island, a privately owned island of approximately 1 acre in area.

References

Bays of Washington County, Maine
Jonesport, Maine
Bays of Maine